Francille Rusan Wilson (born March 7, 1947) is an American historian, best known for her research on black labor, social movements and black women's history.

Early life and education 
Francille Rusan Wilson attended both segregated and desegregated schools in St. Louis County, Missouri. She earned a B.A in Political Science from Wellesley College. During her time at Wellesley, she co founded a black student organization called Ethos, and also was heavily involved in the student activist movements that is responsible for bringing black studies to Wellesley. For her master's degree in Social Studies, Francille attended Harvard University. She then earned a Ph.D and M.A in American History at the University of Pennsylvania in 1988. At University of Pennsylvania she studied under Nell Irvin Painter. She continued her studies through a postdoctoral training at Stanford University for Advanced Study in Behavioral Sciences. She serves on the Los Angeles Commission on the Status of Women as well as on the state board of the California African American Museum.

Career and impact 
Francille Rusan Wilson is a historian whose research focuses on social movements, black intellectuals and the history of black women. She is serving her second term as the National Director of the Association of Black Women Historians (2015-2018), while also maintaining her position as an associate professor in the departments of American Studies and Ethnicity and History at the University of Southern California. Before joining the Departments of American Studies and Ethnicity, and History at USC, Wilson taught African American studies and history at the University of Maryland, Eastern Michigan University, and the University of Michigan in Flint and Ann Arbor.

Francille has written journal entries and one full book. Her book, The Segregated Scholars: Black Social Scientists and the Creation of Black Labor Studies gathers extensive research and historical interviews to examine the lives and professionals of African American labor historians and social scientist.  This particular book has been reviewed numerous times and is argued to have provided the foundation and framework for future debates on Black scholars. This books considers gender, class, and the time period in which these scholars worked. In The Segregated Scholars: Black Social Scientists and the Creation of Black Labor Studies attempts to tell the story of W.E.B. Du Bois and why he focused on black labor studies at such a transitional point in his career. Francille also focuses on African American women narratives. She focuses on women such as Ida B. Wells, Elizabeth Ross Haynes, Josephine St. Pierre Ruffin, and many others. She attempts to explain the ways in which they were not able to work consistently as a social scientist in regards to their barriers of racial and gender discrimination.

List of Publications

Books 
The Segregated Scholars: Black Social Scientists and the Creation of Black Labor Studies, 1890-1950.

Journal articles 
Gertrude Emily Hicks Bustill Mossell: Her Heritage, Her Impact, and Her Legacy

Becoming 'Woman of the Year': Sadie Alexander's Construction of a Public Persona as a Black Professional Women 1920-1950.

Our Foremother's Keepers: The Association of Black Women Historians

Black Women's History at the Intersection of Knowledge of Knowledge and Power: ABWH's Twentieth Anniversary Anthology.

This Past was Waiting for me When I cam: The Contextualization of Black Women's History

Awards and honours 
Francille Rusan Wilson received the Letitia Woods Brown Memorial Book Prize for the best book in African American Women's history for her work The Segregated Scholars: Black Social Scientist and the Creation of Black Labor Studies 1890-1950. This award was presented by the Association of Black Women Historians. Francille served on the boards of the Association for the Study of African American Life and History and the Labor and Working Class History Association. In December 2007, Francille was appointed to the Los Angeles Commission on the Status of Women by the Mayor Antonio Villaraigosa. She serves as the president for the 2009-2010 calendar year. On February 9, 2008 Francille received the Mary McLeod Bethune Excellence in Education Award, through the Our Authors Study Club of Los Angeles. In 2011, Wilson was then appointed to the State Board of the California African American Museum by the governor for a four-year term. She has also received the Distinguished Lecturer Award from the Organization of American Historians, 2013-2012 and 2003-2013.

References

Created via preloaddraft
1947 births
Living people
Wellesley College alumni
University of Pennsylvania School of Arts and Sciences alumni
Harvard Graduate School of Arts and Sciences alumni
American women historians
University of Southern California faculty
University of Maryland, College Park faculty
Eastern Michigan University faculty
People from St. Louis County, Missouri
Historians from Missouri
20th-century American historians
20th-century American women writers
21st-century American historians
21st-century American women writers
African-American historians
Historians from California
20th-century African-American women
21st-century African-American women writers
21st-century African-American writers